Lakhta may refer to:
Lake Lakhta, or Lakhtinsky Razliv, a lake or inlet of the Neva Bay
Lakhta, Saint Petersburg, a historical area of Saint Petersburg, Russia
Lakhta Center, a skyscraper in Saint Petersburg, Russia
Lakhta air base, an air base near Arkhangelsk, Russia
Lakhta (rural locality), several rural localities in Russia
Project Lakhta, a Russian information warfare operation

See also
Lahti, a city in Finland
Lakhta-Olgino Municipal Okrug, a municipal okrug of Primorsky District in St. Petersburg, Russia